Trofeo (Italian and Spanish for trophy) may refer to:

 Trofeo Maserati, a one-make racing series
 Maserati Trofeo, a type of car raced in the series mentioned above
 Oldsmobile Troféo, a variant of the fourth generation Oldsmobile Toronado